Cyclones Judy and Kevin were a pair of intense tropical cyclones that made landfall on the Pacific island nation of Vanuatu, within 48 hours of each other in March 2023. They were the fourth and fifth named storms of the 2022–23 South Pacific cyclone season respectively, as well as the second and third severe tropical cyclones of the season. By the end of February, Judy had affected the Solomon Islands, and shortly after, Kevin began to affect the country.

The nations were pounded by powerful winds and destructive seas. Vanuatu was heavily affected, being struck by both cyclones two days apart. The government asked Australia and New Zealand for aid shortly after Judy's passage. During March 3, as Kevin was impacting the islands, a Magnitude 6.5 earthquake hit just west of Espiritu Santo, and then a Magnitude 5.5 earthquake aftershock hit the island shortly after. Nonetheless, at least no deaths or significant injuries have been reported.

Meteorological history

Cyclone Judy

At this stage, the disturbance was poorly organised as the systems low-level circulation was fully exposed, while atmospheric convection was building over the circulation's northern and eastern quadrants. Over the next couple of days, the system slowly moved westwards and gradually consolidated within a marginal environment for tropical cyclogenesis, with very warm sea surface temperatures of  being offset by moderate to high levels of vertical wind shear.  
During 26 February, as the disturbance continued to develop, the United States Joint Typhoon Warning Center (JTWC) issued a tropical cyclone formation alert (TCFA) on the system, while the FMS reported that 08F had developed into a tropical depression.

The cyclone then began to consolidate, with deepening central convection as it moved southwestward under the influence of a subtropical ridge to its southeast.By 09:00 UTC on 28 February, Judy had strengthened into a Category 1-equivalent tropical cyclone on the Saffir–Simpson hurricane wind scale (SSHWS). Continuing to rapidly intensify, Judy then strengthened into a Category 2-equivalent cyclone. On 1 March, the FMS reported that Judy had become a Category 4 severe tropical cyclone. The JTWC followed suit, upgrading the system to a Category 3-equivalent tropical cyclone. At the same time, the JTWC downgraded the system to a Category 2-equivalent tropical cyclone. 

Turning southeastward, Judy further weakened into a Category 1-equivalent tropical cyclone, as unfavorable environment that consisted of cooling sea surface temperatures and high wind shear unraveled the storm's central convection. At the same time, the FMS passed the responsibility of warning the system to the New Zealand MetService, as it left their area of respsonsibility. At 06:00 UTC the next day, the MetService downgraded Judy to a Category 2 tropical cyclone. Three hours later, the JTWC reclassified Judy as a subtropical system, noting its central convection had been severely sheared to the southeast, partially exposing its low-level circulation center, along with significant erosion of its western peripheries due to an intrusion of a mid-level trough to its southwest. By 4 March, Judy had transitioned to a storm-force extratropical cyclone, with its winds weakening to gale-force 12 hours later.

Cyclone Kevin

At that time, the low had a poorly organised low-level circulation center, however was improving as the environment for tropical cyclogenesis became more favorable, with  sea surface temperatures, moderate wind shear, and weak equatorial outflow aloft. Over the next day, the system progressed eastwards while gradually organizing, with its low-level circulation center being displaced to the east of deep convection. During 1 March, the JTWC issued a TCFA on the system, while the BoM passed the responsibility of warning the system to the FMS as it entered the South Pacific basin, designating the system as Tropical Depression 09F. At 21:00 UTC that same day, 09F strengthened into a Category 1 tropical cyclone in the Australian scale, with the FMS naming it as Kevin. The JTWC subsequently followed suit and initiated advisories on the system. Moving east-southeast under the influence of a subtropical ridge in the same direction, Kevin intensified into a Category 2 tropical cyclone three hours later, as deep convection tightly wrapped its partially exposed low-level circulation center. At 18:00 UTC on 2 March, Kevin intensified into a Category 3 severe tropical cyclone. The JTWC subsequently upgraded the system into a Category 1-equivalent tropical cyclone in the Saffir-Simpson scale three hours later, as a large central dense overcast (CDO) developed over its low-level circulation center. Owing to a favorable environment of warm sea surface temperatures, low wind shear and moderate radial outflow, Kevin intensified to a Category 2-equivalent tropical cyclone by the next day, before undergoing a phase of rapid intensification. At 18:00 UTC that same day, the FMS reported that Kevin further intensified to a Category 4 severe tropical cyclone. The JTWC subsequently upgraded the system to a Category 3-equivalent tropical cyclone three hours later, as it moved over Erromango and Tanna Island in Vanuatu, before it cleared up a  eye, which made Kevin reach its peak intensity as a Category 5-equivalent tropical cyclone in the Saffir-Simpson scale by 4 March, with winds of  according to the JTWC. At the same time, the FMS followed suit and upgraded the system to a Category 5 severe tropical cyclone. However, cooling sea surface temperatures and increasing wind shear made the system weaken to a Category 4-equivalent tropical cyclone nine hours later, as the storm's structure began to unravel on satellite imagery. By 18:00 UTC that same day, the FMS downgraded Kevin to a Category 4 severe tropical cyclone, with the JTWC subsequently downgrading the system to a Category 3-equivalent tropical cyclone, noting the significant deterioration of its convective structure. The FMS passed the responsibility of warning the system to the MetService on 5 March, as it left its area of responsibility while continuing east-southeast.

At the same time, the JTWC further downgraded Kevin to a Category 2-equivalent tropical cyclone, as it continued to rapidly weaken. By 06:00 UTC that same day, the MetService reported that Kevin further weakened to a Category 3 severe tropical cyclone. The JTWC subsequently downgraded the system to a Category 1-equivalent tropical cyclone, before reclassifying Kevin as a subtropical cyclone and issuing their final advisory nine hours later, as the low-level circulation center became partially exposed due to convection becoming decoupled southeastwards. The MetService further downgraded Kevin to a Category 2 tropical cyclone at 18:00 UTC that same day, before it transitioned into a gale-force extratropical cyclone by 6 March. The remnants of the system continued southeastwards, before weakening below gale-force late on 8 March. Kevin's remnants was last noted in the MetService's bulletins on 11 March, before fully dissipating by the next day as it was absorbed by a warm front.

Effects

Solomon Islands
On 26 February, the Solomon Islands Meteorological Service started to issue special weather bulletins, which warned that Judy was expected to cause gale-force winds, rough seas, moderate to heavy swells and costal flooding over southern parts of Temotu Province within 12 - 24 hours. After Judy had been named, the SIMS issued a tropical cyclone warning for Temotu Province and a tropical disturbance warning for the rest of the Solomon Islands.

Cyclone Judy impacted the Solomon Islands at the end of February while the system that became Kevin started affecting the nation soon after. Strong winds and damaging waves battered the many islands of the nation for days. Schools and businesses were shuttered across Honiara due to the winds. The vessel M/V Vatud Star ran aground due to a rogue wave. A small boat carrying passengers enroute from Honiara to Central Province sank due to rough waves, but all of them managed to swim to safety. Tidal waves produced by the storms destroyed 12 homes in West Honiara. Communications with Lata were interrupted.

Vanuatu

Preparations
On 27 February, the Government of Vanuatu issued yellow alerts for Torba, Sanma, Penama, and Malampa Provinces and blue alerts for Shefa and Tafea Provinces ahead of Cyclone Judy's arrival. The four provinces under yellow were soon placed under red alerts as the cyclone progressed along a north to south path through the country. The Vanuatu National Disaster Management Office (NDMO) opened public shelters in Port Vila. The NDMO worked with the Vanuatu Christian Council of Churches to establish shelters at churches in the remainder of Efate Island and neighboring smaller islands. Local volunteers coordinated with international agencies to warn residents of the storm and provide safety information. Schools and businesses were closed nationwide and Air Vanuatu cancelled all flights. UNICEF reported it had response personnel pre-deployed in Vanuatu. The agency had emergency stockpiles in place across the country, including hygiene kits, health kits, tents, and tarpaulins to support more than 20,000 people. Care International pre-positioned household supplies and building materials in Port Vila and Tanna Island.

Ahead of Cyclone Kevin's arrival on 3 March, hundreds of residents fled to public shelters.

Impact
The entirety of Vanuatu was impacted one or both of the cyclones in a four-day period. According to DG ECHO, the entire population experienced winds of at least ; approximately 251,000 people (80 percent of the population) were affected by Category 2–3 winds, of whom 150,000 were affected by Category 3–4 winds. Early assessments indicated the worst damage to be in Malapa, Penama, and Shefa Provinces. The storms severed access to running water in these areas and runoff contamination rendered river waters unsafe for consumption. Extensive power outages occurred, with Port Vila remaining offline through 4 March. Bauerfield International Airport sustained damage. Strong winds from Judy tore the roof off the infant ward at the Vanuatu Central Hospital. Satellite analyses of imagery from the Sentinel-2 by UNOSAT on 4 March revealed extensive damage in Shefa Province with potential storm surge damage along the west coast of Efate Island. Damaged structures were found on Aniwa Island and Erromango Island in Tafea Province.

Cyclone Judy brought hurricane-force winds to Efate Island on 28 February, and its eye passed directly over the capital city of Port Vila. Erromango and Tanna islands lost all communications on 1 March, with the latter remaining isolated nearly a week later. Tropical Cyclone Judy has been bringing heavy rain and strong winds, and requiring the evacuation of residents from the capital, Port Vila. However, there are no reports of deaths or serious injuries in Port Vila from Cyclone Judy.

The earthquake had a maximum Modified Mercalli intensity of VI, indicating strong shaking conditions. The Pacific Tsunami Warning Center indicated no risk of a tsunami. A magnitude 5.5 earthquake aftershock struck the island shortly after.

Effects elsewhere
On 28 February, New Zealand's MetService noted a risk of strong winds and large waves for New Caledonia as Cyclone Judy passed to the northeast. A pre-cyclone alert was raised for the Loyalty Islands Province on 2 March as Kevin passed to the northeast.

The Tonga Meteorological Service stated that the cyclones would likely remain far enough away to not have much impact; however, a small chance existed for Kevin to affect the kingdom. During the overnight of 4–5 March, Kevin entered Tonga's territorial waters in the ʻOtu Muʻomuʻa group of islands near Tele-ki-Tokelau and Tele-ki Tonga. As of 6 March no damage was reported.

Although Kevin remained far to the south and west of Fiji on 3–4 March, associated inclement weather stemming from a trough prompted the issuance of heavy rain warnings for Ba, Kadavu, Lau, Lomaiviti, Nadroga-Navosa, and Ra provinces. The Fiji Meteorological Service warned that the southernmost islands could see winds of  along with damaging ocean swells. Strong winds felled a royal poinciana tree in Naikabula, Ba Province, destroying a home in the process.

Aftermath

Solomon Islands

Vanuatu

The Government of Vanuatu declared a state of emergency on 2 March. Shortly after Judy's passage, the Government requested international assistance from Australia and New Zealand. The former pledged to provide water, medical supplies, and damage assessment teams by 6 March. In accordance with the FRANZ agreement the New Zealand High Commission headed coordination with Australia, France, and New Zealand for relief efforts. Within two days, two C-17 Globemaster aircraft reached Port Vila carrying the initial supplies and a 12 person rapid response team. On 5 March, the Royal Australian Navy's HMAS Canberra set sail from Sydney, Australia, toward Vanuatu. The ship carried 600 Australian Defence Force personnel, three CH-47 Chinook helicopters, and landing craft for deployment. The ship could also serve as a mobile hospital. World Vision Australia set up a disaster center to distribute supplies in Port Vila. New Zealand, still reeling from the impacts of Cyclone Gabrielle, deployed a C-130 Hercules aircraft carrying water, temporary shelter kits, and hygiene kits on 4 March. A seven member team was also sent to assist in response coordination. Furthermore, the Government made a NZ$150,000 cash donation to Vanuatu. Papua New Guinea Prime Minister James Marape offered assistance to Vanuatu on 6 March.

UNICEF sent a 16 member team to Vanuatu to conduct needs assessments and assist in supply distribution by 4 March. They partnered with the Vanuatu Red Cross Society by 4 March to distribute emergency supplies to affected residents. The agency also pledged additional supplies from stockpiles in Fiji. DG ECHO sent their Rapid Response Coordinator to conduct a needs assessment on 6 March.

Digicel suspended call fees to Vanuatu from Fiji, Samoa, Tonga, and Nauru from 6 to 19 March.

See also

 Weather of 2023
 Tropical cyclones in 2023
 Other storms named Judy
 Other storms named Kevin
 Cyclones Eric and Nigel  (1985) – two strong tropical cyclones that impacted Vanuatu and Fiji within a week of each other.
 Cyclones Uma and Veli (1987) – another pair of tropical cyclones which impacted Vanuatu within a week of each other.

References

External links

2023 in the Solomon Islands
2023 in Vanuatu
2023 in New Caledonia
2022–23 South Pacific cyclone season
2022–23 Australian region cyclone season
Category 4 South Pacific cyclones
Category 5 South Pacific cyclones
Tropical cyclones in Vanuatu
Tropical cyclones in the Solomon Islands
Tropical cyclones in New Caledonia
Tropical cyclones in Fiji
Tropical cyclones in 2023
February 2023 events in Oceania
March 2023 events in Oceania
Tropical cyclones in Queensland